Rosie Alice Huntington-Whiteley (born 18 April 1987) is a British model and actress. She is best known for her work for lingerie retailer Victoria's Secret, formerly being one of their brand "Angels", for being the face of Burberry's 2011 brand fragrance Burberry Body, for her work with Marks & Spencer, and, most recently, for her artistic collaboration with denim-focused fashion brand Paige.

Moving into acting, she had supporting roles as Carly Spencer in the 2011 film Transformers: Dark of the Moon, the third installment in the Transformers film series, and as The Splendid Angharad in the 2015 film Mad Max: Fury Road.

Early life 
Huntington-Whiteley was born in Plymouth, Devon, England, the daughter of Charles Andrew Huntington-Whiteley, a chartered surveyor, and fitness instructor Fiona Yvonne, daughter of Alan Jackson of Buckinghamshire. She has two younger siblings, a brother and a sister. She grew up on a farm near Tavistock, Devon. Her paternal great-grandfather, Wing-Commander Eric Huntington-Whiteley, JP, was the nephew of George Whiteley, 1st Baron Marchamley and the younger son of politician Sir Herbert Huntington-Whiteley, 1st Baronet; Eric's wife, Rosie's great-grandmother, Enid Etta Cohn, was from a family of Polish Jews who emigrated to England in the 1870s. Rosie's paternal grandmother, Gillian, also from a Jewish family, was the daughter of surgeon Jacob Franks, of West Chiltington, Sussex.

Educated at Tavistock College, she later revealed that she was bullied and teased at school for having a double-barrelled name, small breasts and full lips.

Career

Modelling 
As a 15-year-old student, she undertook work experience at London West End-based model agency Profile, before taking her GCSEs. Signed after leaving school in Summer 2003, aged 16, her first modelling session was for a Levi's jeans commercial. She got her first big break in January 2004 when she travelled to New York City for a shoot with Teen Vogue. She later made her catwalk debut alongside Naomi Campbell in New York City in Spring 2004, and was then photographed by Bruce Weber for Abercrombie & Fitch.

In early 2006, she was signed to American lingerie brand Victoria's Secret, making her debut at the brand's fashion show in Los Angeles.

Huntington-Whiteley remained unknown outside the fashion industry until 2008, when she was cast by chief creative director Christopher Bailey, replacing Agyness Deyn for Burberry's Autumn/Winter campaign with actor Sam Riley. She got her first British Vogue cover on the November 2008 issue, alongside Eden Clark and Jourdan Dunn in a feature celebrating British models. The following year, she was featured as the face of Karen Millen's Spring/Summer 2009 advertising campaign. She starred in a short film for Agent Provocateur lingerie, playing a woman whose boyfriend forgets Valentine's Day.

For Fall/Winter 2009, she modelled in campaigns for Godiva and Miss Sixty. In February 2010, Huntington-Whiteley officially became a Victoria's Secret Angel and took part in the annual Victoria's Secret Fashion Show in New York City. She confirmed the following year that she wouldn't walk the show, and has since stated that she left Victoria's Secret to pursue other opportunities, as she was "well aware of the short shelf-life a model has".

In 2010, she posed nude for the Pirelli Calendar, which was photographed by Terry Richardson. Huntington-Whiteley hit the runway for designers Prada in Milan and Giles Deacon in Paris. For SS10 her advertising campaigns included Monsoon's first underwear line, Thomas Wylde, Full Circle, and VS Online. In March, she collaborated with VOGUE.COM to share her outfit choices daily for the Today I'm Wearing feature. She appeared on the covers of the May 2010 issues of Harper's Bazaar Russia and GQ UK. She was featured on the cover of LOVE Magazine's September issue, styled as a pinup girl. For FW10 she modelled for Burberry as well as the company's first beauty line; her other advertising campaigns included Thomas Wylde and Leon Max.

Fashion photographer Rankin devoted a book entirely to her entitled Ten Times Rosie. Rankin opined that Huntington-Whiteley brought something different to modelling: "We've been looking at very, very skinny, almost masculine girls for a long time. [Rosie] really is the model of the moment. She's the actress of the moment. She's definitely going to become something much, much bigger." Celebrity make-up artist Ruby Hammer, who has worked with Huntington-Whiteley for years, described her as the "quintessential" English rose.

In March 2011, Huntington-Whiteley landed her first solo British Vogue cover and appeared on the covers of the UK's July issues of Elle and GQ. She was unveiled as the face of Burberry's newest fragrance, Burberry Body, in July 2011. In 2013, Huntington-Whiteley starred alongside Helena Bonham Carter and David Gandy in the Marks & Spencer Christmas advert. She was also announced as the face of Australian cosmetics brand ModelCo.  In 2014, PAIGE announced Huntington-Whiteley as their ambassador for their upcoming Spring 2015 ad campaign. In February 2017, PAIGE launched their first ever design collaboration with Huntington-Whiteley on a 17 piece capsule collection for Spring called Rosie HW x PAIGE. This was followed by a Fall collection consisting of 20 pieces.

Shortly following the birth of her first child, she launched her website named "Rose Inc". The page started out as a beauty publication which worked in tandem with its Instagram and YouTube accounts. In August 2021, the brand expanded to selling its own clean makeup and skincare.

She has walked the runways for Givenchy, Burberry, Oscar De La Renta, Valentino, Michael Kors, Roberto Cavalli, Balmain, Louis Vuitton, DSquared2, Badgley Mischka, Blumarine, Marchesa, Vivienne Tam, Versace, Vera Wang, Betsey Johnson, Alberta Ferretti, Prada, Giles Deacon, and Moschino.

She has appeared in advertising campaigns for Dolce & Gabbana, Burberry, Nirav Modi, Ralph Lauren, DKNY, Escada, Versace, Leon Max, Prabal Gurung, Balmain, Karen Millen, Loewe, Bvlgari, Tommy Hilfiger, BCBG, Thomas Wylde, Clinique, Sportmax, Topshop, Marks & Spencer, Victoria's Secret, French Connection, Levi's, Macy's, and Bloomingdale's.

Acting 
In May 2010, it was announced that Huntington-Whiteley would become the new female lead in Transformers: Dark of the Moon, released 29 June 2011, replacing Megan Fox. She had previously worked with the film's director, Michael Bay, on a Victoria's Secret commercial. MTV Networks' NextMovie.com named her one of the "Breakout Stars to Watch for in 2011". Prior to the film's release, she won the "Female Star of Tomorrow" award at the 2011 CinemaCon Awards.

Reviewers were critical of the acting of Huntington-Whiteley and co-star Shia LaBeouf. Peter Travers (of Wenner Media) stated the two "couldn't be duller". Jason Solomons of The Observer wrote that "we're first introduced to Rosie via a close-up of her bum, segueing straight from the film's opening sequence and titles on to the pert buttocks and underwear of our heroine", and that Huntington-Whiteley's English posh girl accent "renders her practically unintelligible when surrounded by American accents and falling masonry". Much of the criticism towards Rosie Huntington-Whiteley compared her in an unfavorable light to Megan Fox. Lou Lumenick said that her "'acting' makes...Megan Fox look like Meryl Streep in comparison". In a positive review, Drew McWeeny of HitFix said, "She reminds me of Cameron Diaz in The Mask, an actress who doesn't really show off any range, but who gives a natural, winning performance and who is up to the challenge of this particular picture."

Huntington-Whiteley had her second acting role in the film Mad Max: Fury Road, which was released in May 2015. She played The Splendid Angharad, one of the Five Wives of the warlord Immortan Joe. In order to portray her pregnant character, she wore a prosthetic abdomen throughout the film.

Personal life 
Since 2010, she has been in a relationship with actor Jason Statham. In January 2016, her representative confirmed they had become engaged. Their son was born on June 24, 2017. In August 2021, she announced they were expecting their second child together. Their daughter was born on February 2, 2022.

She used to smoke, as she said in an interview with David Letterman: "I got a work placement at a modelling agency and then I spent the week making coffee and picking up the telephone and smoking cigarettes and drinking wine at 11 AM, it was very Ab Fab". She last publicly smoked in 2012 and has since quit.

Filmography

Film

Accolades 

Huntington-Whiteley received Elle Style Awards for 2009's "Model of the Year," 2012's "Top Style Icon" and 2015's "Model of the Year."  In 2011, she was voted No. 1 in Maxim Magazine's "Hot 100" list and received the "Editor's Special Award" at the Glamour Awards. At the Harper's Bazaar Women of the Year Awards she was named 2014's "Model of the Year" and 2016's "Businesswoman of the Year."

As of July 2011, Huntington-Whiteley was ranked No. 15 on "The Money Girls" list and No. 3 on the "Top 20 Sexiest Models" list at models.com. She was also voted No. 22 in [[FHM's 100 Sexiest Women (UK)|FHM'''s World's Sexiest Woman]] 2015 poll. In 2016 and 2017, Huntington-Whiteley appeared at #5 on Forbes' World's Highest Paid Models List with estimated earnings at $9 million and $9.5 million respectively.

 Awards and nominations 

 See also 
 Huntington-Whiteley baronets

 References 

 Bibliography 
 Rankin Photography: Ten Times Rosie''. London: The Full Service, 2010. .

External links 

 
 
 
 

1987 births
Living people
English expatriates in the United States
English female models
English people of Polish-Jewish descent
Jewish artists
People from Tavistock
Victoria's Secret Angels
Rosie